Ichiro Tai from the Toshiba Corporation, Minato-ku, Tokyo, Japan was named Fellow of the Institute of Electrical and Electronics Engineers (IEEE) in 2012 for leadership in development of nuclear instrumentation and control systems.

References 

Fellow Members of the IEEE
Living people
Year of birth missing (living people)
Place of birth missing (living people)